José Antonio Viera-Gallo Quesney (born 2 December 1943) is a Chilean politician.

Before turning 30, Viera-Gallo was a Member of Congress during the left-wing elected government of president Salvador Allende, representing the Socialist Party of Chile.  Following the 1973 coup by General Augusto Pinochet, he was among those persecuted by the new regime.  Like other left-wing ousted politicians, he sought refuge in a foreign diplomatic mission, specifically the Apostolic Nunciature, where he lived for over six months.

With the help of then Apostolic Nuncio Angelo Sodano (who would later rise to the rank of cardinal in the Catholic hierarchy), Viera-Gallo was able to obtain safe passage out of Chile, and moved to exile in Rome, Italy.  Together with other politicians including Bernardo Leighton, and with the support of leading Italian socialists including Bettino Craxi and Rino Formica, he led the Socialist Party of Chile from exile in Italy, while the Communist Party of Chile was led by Colodomiro Almeida and others from Moscow in the then Soviet Union.

As part of his advocacy efforts to fight the regime of Augusto Pinochet, Viera-Gallo founded the magazine ChileAmérica, which would later become incorporated into the Centre for Social Studies (CESOC). In 1985 he was allowed to return to Chile.  During the government of president Patricio Aylwin, he was President of the Chamber of Deputies from 11 March 1990 to 21 July 1993.

Viera-Gallo later covered various other appointments, including lead senator of his party. From 2007 to 2010, he was Minister Secretary General of the Presidency, in the government of Michelle Bachelet. In  2010 prior to becoming a member of the Constitutional Tribunal, he quit the Socialist Party. He is married to Maria Teresa Chadwick, and has three daughters: Maria José, Titi, and Manuela.

Publications
 "Investigaciones para un estudio de la Revolución en América Latina" 
 "La trampa de la Seguridad, Carrera Armamentista y Desarme" 
 "Chile: Un Nuevo Camino" 
 "11 de septiembre, la Pausa de la Razón" 
 "Se abre la Sesión"
 Foreword in "La Tansición Cubana y el Bloqueo Norteamericano" by Maurizio Giuliano

Sources
Curriculum of Senator Viera-Gallo

1943 births
Living people
Members of the Chamber of Deputies of Chile
Chilean Ministers Secretary General of the Presidency
Chilean essayists
Chilean political writers
People from Santiago
United Conservative Party (Chile) politicians
Popular Unitary Action Movement politicians
Party for Democracy (Chile) politicians
Socialist Party of Chile politicians
Colegio del Verbo Divino alumni
Cycling advocates